The 1962  New South Wales  state election  was held on 3 March 1962. The election was for all of the 94 seats in the  Legislative Assembly.

Redistribution
A redistribution of electoral boundaries was undertaken in 1961 based on that year's Australian Census. The redistribution reflected the continuing relative population shifts from the Country and Eastern suburbs of Sydney to Western Sydney and the Central Coast. The Hunter Valley seat of Liverpool Plains, held by the Country Party was abolished while in the eastern suburbs the safe Liberal seat of Woollahra and the safe Labor seat of Paddington-Waverley were combined to form the marginal seat of Bligh. In  Northern Sydney, the marginal Labor seat of North Sydney and the safe Liberal seat of Neutral Bay were combined to form the relatively safe Liberal seat of Kirribilli. Wakehurst was created in the Northern Beaches area with a notional Liberal majority and on the Central Coast, the seat of Wyong was established and was expected to have a large Labor majority. In Western Sydney  the seats of Merrylands and Leichhardt were abolished and replaced by the safe Labor seats of Wentworthville and Bass Hill. The seat of The Hills was established in North-west Sydney  mainly from the northern portion of Blacktown and this made Blacktown a safe Labor seat. While the theoretical effect of the redistribution was to increase the Liberal numbers by 1 at the expense of the Country Party, the boundary changes significantly improved Labor's position in several seats including Nepean, Coogee and Drummoyne. Joan Rydon estimated that the coalition would have needed 52% of the overall vote to win office.

Key dates

Issues
In March 1962, Labor had been in power for 21 years and Robert Heffron  had been premier for 2 and a half years.  Heffron was 72 at the time of the election and his age and the longevity of the government were made issues by the opposition which described it as being composed of "tired old men". The prestige of Heffron's government had suffered when the electors clearly rejected its proposal to abolish the New South Wales Legislative Council at a referendum in April 1961. Labor's  new policies for the election included the establishment of a Department of Industrial Development to reduce unemployment, free school travel, aid to home buyers and commencing the construction of the Sydney–Newcastle Freeway as a toll-road.

In contrast to Labor the leader of the conservative coalition, Robin Askin put forward a positive program and addressed contentious issues including the introduction of State Aid for private schools, making rent control fairer and the legalisation of off-course betting on horse races. Askin accused the state government of allowing the transport infrastructure of the state to decline. He promised to build the Newcastle freeway without a toll, to construct the Eastern Suburbs Railway and to plan for a second crossing of Sydney Harbour. Askin also promised more resources for mental health and district hospitals.

Results

The Labor government's position improved substantially at this election. It had a buffer of 7 seats in the new parliament:

Prior to the election Labor had gained the seat of Lismore from the Country Party at a by-election after the Court of Disputed Returns ruling the 1959 election result invalid. Labor had lost the seat of Liverpool Plains to the Country Party at a by-election caused by the resignation of Roger Nott. However, Liverpool Plains was abolished by the redistribution at this election. In Oxley the sitting member, Les Jordan changed his allegiance from the Country Party to the Liberal Party,

Labor regained the seat of Waratah from the independent incumbent Frank Purdue and, as expected,  won the new seats of Wyong, Wentworthville, Bass Hill and Bligh. Labor also gained Blacktown, Nepean, Drummoyne and Coogee from the Liberals.

The Liberal Party won the new seats of Kirribilli, Wakehurst and The Hills. In Manly, the sitting Liberal member Douglas Darby, who had lost his party's pre-selection,  successfully contested the seat as an Independent Liberal.

The DLP and the Communist party both performed poorly, each party gained less than 2% of the primary vote.

Non-elected Premier Bob Heffron was elected his own right as Premier and would be the last non-elected Premier to achieve this until Morris Iemma in 2007.

{{Australian elections/Title row
| table style = float:right;clear:right;margin-left:1em;
| title        = New South Wales state election, 3 March 1962
| house        = Legislative Assembly
| series       = New South Wales state election
| back         = 1959
| forward      = 1965
| enrolled     = 2,173,768
| total_votes  = 1,957,406
| turnout %    = 94.00
| turnout chg  = +0.00
| informal     = 30,048
| informal %   = 1.54
| informal chg = −0.29
}}

|}

{{bar box |float=right| title=Popular vote | titlebar=#ddd | width=600px | barwidth=410px | bars= 

}}

Retiring members

Seats changing party representation

Aftermath
Robert Heffron resigned in April 1964, aged 74 and was replaced by Jack Renshaw. Robert Askin and Charles Cutler remained as leaders of their respective parties throughout the term of the parliament. During the parliament there were 4 by-elections. These produced no change in party representation with the exception of Labor losing Waratah to the independent former member, Frank Purdue.

See also
 Candidates of the 1962 New South Wales state election
 Members of the New South Wales Legislative Assembly, 1962–1965

Notes

References

Elections in New South Wales
1962 elections in Australia
1960s in New South Wales
March 1962 events in Australia